Whalley is the most densely populated and urban of the six town centres in Surrey, British Columbia, Canada.  It encompasses City Centre, the city's central business district, and is home to the Surrey City Hall, the main branch of Surrey Libraries, Central City, SFU Surrey and the site of Kwantlen Polytechnic University's (KPU) Civic Plaza campus. It is the only town centre in Surrey served by Metro Vancouver's SkyTrain rapid transit system. Expo Line stations serving Whalley include Scott Road, Gateway, Surrey Central and King George.

Based on the city of Surrey statistics, Whalley is the second-most populous community in Surrey after Newton.  the population of Whalley is 75,610, while the population of City Centre, the central subarea in the Whalley core, is 26,945. The total population of the area is 102,555. Whalley is represented in the Legislative Assembly of British Columbia by the Surrey-Whalley riding and in the House of Commons of Canada by the Surrey North riding. Randeep Sarai is Whalley's Member of Parliament, and Bruce Ralston is its MLA.

History 
As early as the 1880s, people began settling what is now Whalley. In 1908, the municipal council requested a grant to construct a roadway from Fraser Bridge to present-day 108 Avenue. This provided a much safer path to the river compared to the steep, winding Old Yale Road, and the new road later became part of King George Boulevard.

In 1925, Arthur Whalley moved his family from Cloverdale to a three-acre triangle of land at the future intersection of Ferguson Road (108 Avenue), Grosvenor Road and King George Boulevard. After clearing the land and spending their first winter in tents, they built a service station, which included a general store, soft drink stand, and tourist cabins.

The community officially adopted the name of Whalley in 1948, after the board of trade held a contest to rename what had become known as "Whalley's Corner". "Binnieville" had also been recommended, in honour of Tom Binnie, a local real estate and insurance broker who had fostered Whalley's growth as a commercial centre.

In the mid-20th century, Whalley saw numerous debates regarding its secession from Surrey to become a separate city or municipality. In 1976, Metro Vancouver (then known as the GVRD) identified Whalley as one of four regional town centres, sparking revitalization of the town centre. The City of Surrey adopted the "Whalley–Guildford Plan" in 1985, proposing high-density commercial development along 104 Avenue between the Whalley and Guildford areas.

In 2016, Coast Capital Savings moved their headquarters into City Centre at the King George Hub complex. In September 2020, Westland Insurance announced that they planned to move their headquarters into the district in 2022.

Culture and cityscape

Whalley is home to several public facilities such as Surrey City Hall and the Surrey City Centre Library. On December 22, 2019, the North Surrey Recreation Centre closed for redevelopment. The facility had an indoor swimming pool and two ice rinks.

It consists of residential and office units, as well as a hotel.

Demographics
In 2016, the City of Surrey began publishing data separately for a subarea of Whalley called "City Centre". City Centre is located directly in the heart of the original Whalley neighbourhood.

Whalley

City Centre

Climate
Temperature extremes range from 37.0 °C, recorded on 29 May 1983, to −21.7 °C, recorded on 28 January 1969.

Crime
Whalley was once regarded as the one of the most dangerous part of the Lower Mainland and was notorious for its crime. Until 2018, its streets were home to Surrey's "tent city": a strip along one of its inner neighbourhoods which was home to hundreds of homeless people. Since the early 2010s, after redevelopment of the area, violent crime has shifted south to Newton, which has taken over Whalley's reputation as being the most dangerous part of Surrey.

Surrounding communities

References

Further reading 
 Natrasony, S.M. & Alexander, D. (2005). "The rise of modernism and the decline of place: The case of Surrey City Centre, Canada". Planning Perspectives, 20(4), 413–433. doi: 10.1080/02665430500239489. Retrieved: /10613/2895

External links
City of Surrey website

Neighbourhoods in Surrey, British Columbia
Central business districts in Canada